Samir-Adel Louahla (born 10 September 1974) is an Algerian former sprinter who competed in the 2000 Summer Olympics.

References

1974 births
Living people
Algerian male sprinters
Olympic athletes of Algeria
Athletes (track and field) at the 2000 Summer Olympics
Mediterranean Games gold medalists for Algeria
Mediterranean Games medalists in athletics
Athletes (track and field) at the 1997 Mediterranean Games
21st-century Algerian people